Vallalapatti is a panchayat town in Melur Taluk in Madurai district in the Indian state of Tamil Nadu.

Geography
The Town is situated 30 km from Madurai on the Alagar kovil-Melur main road. From Melur and Alagar Kovil it is 7 km. The town has 51 streets.

Governance
 India census, Vallalapatti was a first grade Town Panchayat. It was constituted in 1962. The town is under the administration of Madurai district. It includes 15 wards. 

The Assembly Constituency is Melur (state assembly constituency).

The Parliament Constituency is Madurai (Lok Sabha constituency)

Economy 
The Town primarily comprises residential, commercial, institutional buildings. The primary occupations are agriculture, small business and minor cottage industries.

Demographics

The population of the town was 8325 (2011 Census). The male population is 4177. The female population is 4148.

Archeological sites

 Jain Monument is located at the foot of Ovamalai/Kalinjamalai at -. Also, Tamizhi script can be seen in this cave entrance. 
 Maangulam archeological findings (-). மாங்குளம் கல்வெட்டுகள். These are the earliest among the Brahmi inscriptions in Tamil Nadu. This epigraph was first documented in 1882 by Robert Sewell, in Lists of The Antiquarian Remains in The Presidency of Madras Volume 1. This Tamizhi epigraph was dated to 3 Century BC.
 Kudavarai koil. A rare statue of Shiva form - Laguleesar along with Sivalingam and Pillaiyar (resembles Karpaga Vinayagar statue). Crafted in 7-8th Century A.D.

References

Cities and towns in Madurai district